Mombongo Airport  is an airport serving the Congo River town of Mombongo in Tshopo Province, Democratic Republic of the Congo.

See also

Transport in the Democratic Republic of the Congo
List of airports in the Democratic Republic of the Congo

References

External links
 OpenStreetMap - Mombongo
 FallingRain - Mombongo Airport
 HERE Maps - Mombongo
 OurAirports - Mombongo
 

Airports in Tshopo